The Civic Alliance of Kosovo (Aleanca Qytetare e Kosovës) is a political party in Kosovo. At the last legislative elections on 24 October 2004, the party was part of the Alliance for the Future of Kosovo.

Political parties in Kosovo